KNCK (1390 AM, "1390 Memories") is an oldies music formatted radio station licensed to Concordia, Kansas, serving Concordia and Cloud County, Kansas.  KNCK is owned and operated by Barbara White, through licensee White Communications, LLC. The station derives a portion of its programming from Jones Radio Network's "Kool Gold" Network.

History
Local businessman Charles Cook, who made his fortune by starting a brick manufacturing plant called Cloud Ceramics, helped start KNCK in 1954.

See also
 KNCK-FM

References

External links

NCK
Oldies radio stations in the United States
Radio stations established in 1954
Cloud County, Kansas